ISIRTA plays, R - Z

Plays, with titles beginning with 'R', 'S', 'T', 'U', 'V', 'W', 'X', 'Y' and 'Z' on the radio comedy programme "I'm Sorry, I'll Read That Again".

R plays

RAF Briefing

Cast

Structure of the episode

Radio Prune Awards

Cast

Structure of the episode

The Ramond Nostril Story

Cast

Structure of the episode

Report on Schools
Introduction by David Hatch

School names are listed in bold letters

Cast

 "School Report Reader" — Tim Brooke-Taylor
 1st Presenter — John Cleese
 "Arithmetic Pronouncer" — Jo Kendall
 2nd Presenter — David Hatch
 3rd Presenter — Tim Brooke-Taylor
 1st Presenter / Interviewer — David Hatch
 Hermione Fortescue-Fitch-Fielding — Jo Kendall
 Roger Fortescue-Fitch-Fielding — Bill Oddie
 Arthur Blunt — Graeme Garden

Workhouse Manor
 Barnaby Bull-Strangler — John Cleese

Grimdyke Keep Girls' School for the Daughters of the Gentry, Nobility, and Those in Peril-On-The-Sea
 Dame Fred Oyster-Prejudice — Jo Kendall
 2nd Presenter / Interviewer — John CleeseThe Creek Waterford College for Boys Principal — Tim Brooke-TaylorLady Sabrina's Hall for Young Gentlewomen Principal — Jo KendallThe Relief of Makeking Memorial College Principal — Graeme GardenJim Foster's School for Lads Principal — Bill OddieThe Prancing College for Young Gentlemen Principal — Tim Brooke-Taylor

Structure of the episode

Review of the Pops

Cast

Structure of the episode

The Rise and Fall of the Roman Empire

Cast

Structure of the episode

The Roaring Twenties

Cast

Structure of the episode

Robin Hood
Written by Graeme Garden and John Cleese

 Story narration - sung by David Hatch

Cast
(cast in order of appearance)

Main characters are listed in bold letters

Short discussion between David Hatch and Bill Oddie

 Curtain — Tim Brooke-Taylor
 Maid Marion — Jo Kendall
 Friar Tuck — Bill Oddie
 Robin Hood — Tim Brooke-Taylor
 Alan 'A Gabriel — Graeme Garden
 Will Scarlet — David Hatch
 Little John — John Cleese
 Sir Angus of the Prune — John Cleese
 Gribling (the Bailiff) — Bill Oddie
 Sheriff of Nottingham — Graeme Garden
 Master of Ceremonies for the "Archery Competition" — John Cleese
 Deputy Sheriff — Graeme Garden

Robinson Prunestone

Cast

Structure of the episode
 Cold Open: Facetious Patient – Graeme Garden and John Cleese
 Skit: Problem Corner with Marjorie Droops – Tim Brooke-Taylor, Jo Kendall, and Graeme Garden
 Skit: The Doctor Will See You Now – John Cleese, Bill Oddie, and Jo Kendall
 Song: Bounce! – Bill Oddie and the Cast
 Skit: The Accusative Case – Tim Brooke-Taylor and Bill Oddie
 Play: Robinson Prunestone – The Cast

S plays

Search for the Nile

Cast

Structure of the episode

Son of the Bride of Frankenstein

Cast
 Narrator ― David Hatch
 Arthur ― Tim Brooke-Taylor
 Arthur's Wife ― Jo Kendall
 Dr. Frankenstein ― Graeme Garden
 Dracula ― John Cleese
 The Creature (Lady Constance de Coverlet) ― Tim Brooke-Taylor
 Igor ― Bill Oddie
 Landlord ― John Cleese
 Traumatized Villager ― Graeme Garden
 David Frost, the Vampire Rabbit ― Bill Oddie
 1st Villager ― Graeme Garden
 2nd Villager ― Bill Oddie
 The Moon ― John Cleese
 The Occasional Twig ― John Cleese
 The Whistling Wind ― Bill Oddie
 The Brewing Storm ― John Cleese

Structure of the episode

 Cold Open: Radio Prune Is Nine Weeks Old ― The Cast
 Skit: Radio Critics Write ― The Cast
 Skit: Set-Up-A-Sketch Competition ― Jo Kendall, Graeme Garden, Tim Brooke-Taylor
 Skit: Broadcasting Changes 
 Skit/Song: Listen With Mother, with The Brew That We All Love the Most (Irish Folk Song) ― Jo Kendall, Bill Oddie, John Cleese, Graeme Garden, and Tim Brooke-Taylor
 Prune Play: The Return of the Son of the Bride of Frankenstein ― The Cast

Song of the South

Cast

Structure of the episode

Star Trek
Written by Graeme Garden and Bill Oddie

Cast
Characters in bold letters

 Announcer and Narrator — David Hatch
 Narrator — Graeme Garden
 Captain Kink — Tim Brooke-Taylor
 Sulu — John Cleese
 Spock — John Cleese
 Scotty— Graeme Garden
 Spock — Graeme Garden
 McCoy — Graeme Garden
 Lieutenant Oddie — Bill Oddie
 Controller — John Cleese
 Lady Constance — Tim Brooke-Taylor
 Terry Wogan — Graeme Garden
 Jimmy Savile — Bill Oddie
 Monster — Jo Kendall
 Stuart Henry — John Cleese
 Riddles — Tim Brooke-Taylor
 Peter Brough — Graeme Garden
 Tony Blackburn — Tim Brooke-Taylor
 John Peel — Graeme Garden
 wife — Graeme Garden

Structure of the episode

The Supernatural

Cast

Structure of the episode
 Skit: Radio Quiz Game
(opening music)
 Message: Urgent lookout for robber
 Skit: Frankenstein (Bert Smith)
 Song: "Rhubarb Tart"
 Play: "The Supernatural"
 Song: "Meet Me in the Churchyard, Nellie

T plays

Take Your Pixie

Cast

Structure of the episode

Tales of the Old West

Cast

Structure of the episode

The Taming of the Shrew

Cast

Structure of the episode

Teddy and Rupert Bear

Cast

Structure of the episode

The Telephone

Cast

Structure of the episode

Ten Thousand BC (The Dawn of Civilization)

Cast

Structure of the episode

3:17 to Cleethorpes

Cast

Structure of the episode

Tim Brown's Schooldays

Cast
(cast in order of appearance)

The characters are listed in bold letters

 Tim Brown (a student) — Tim Brooke-Taylor 
 The Butler — Bill Oddie
 The Headmaster — David Hatch
 Mr. Totteridge (History Master) — Graeme Garden
 Tomkins Minor (a student) — David Hatch
 Mrs. Greystone (tuck shop lady) — Jo Kendall
 Mr. Flashman (school bully) — John Cleese
 Mr. Grimfettle (Games Master) — David Hatch

Structure of the episode

20,000 Leaks Under the Sea

Cast
 Narrators ― David Hatch and Graeme Garden
 Prof. Herman Summex ― Tim Brooke-Taylor
 Mary ― Jo Kendall
 Luke Lively ― Bill Oddie
 Captain Nemo ― Graeme Garden
 Sea Creature (Lady Constance de Coverlet) ― Tim Brooke-Taylor
 Hardened Seaman/Anchor Chief ― John Cleese
 Old Fisherman ― Graeme Garden
 Men Fighting for Survival ― Tim Brooke-Taylor and Bill Oddie
 Wailing Ship ― John Cleese
 Whale Teacher ― John Cleese
 David Frothed ― John Cleese

Structure of the episode
 Cold Open: The Bear and Cookie Joke ― David Hatch, Graeme Garden, Bill Oddie, John Cleese, and Tim Brooke-Taylor, with Jo Kendall
 Skit: Teapot ― David Hatch, Graeme Garden, Bill Oddie, Jo Kendall, and John Cleese
 Skit: Pop Roundup ― Graeme Garden, David Hatch, Bill Oddie, Tim Brooke-Taylor, and John Cleese
 Skit: The Julie Andrews Songbook (Expurgated Version)
 Joke: Good Clean Laugh ― David Hatch, John Cleese, and Graeme Garden
 Skit: Police Message ― David Hatch
 Skit: Late Racing Result ― Jo Kendall and John Cleese
 Skit: The Money Programme ― David Hatch, Graeme Garden, Jo Kendall, Tim Brooke-Taylor, and John Cleese
 Song: TV Themes Medley ― Bill Oddie and the Cast
 Prune Play: 20,000 Leaks Under the Sea ― The Cast

U plays

The Unexplained

Cast

Structure of the episode

Universal Challenge

Cast:
 (cast in order of appearance)

The characters are listed in bold letters
 
 (The character names for each sketch (i.e. the parts played by each member of the cast in each of the sketches) are missing.  Please add.  Thank you.

Universal Challenge
 Character name - Greame Garden
 Character name - David Hatch
 Character name - Jo Kendall
 Character name - Bill Oddie
 Character name - Tim Brooke-Taylor

Masochistic Monks
 Character name - Greame Garden
 Character name - David Hatch
 Character name - Jo Kendall
 Character name - Bill Oddie
 Character name - Tim Brooke-Taylor

Stately Home
 Character name - Greame Garden
 Character name - David Hatch
 Character name - Jo Kendall
 Character name - Bill Oddie
 Character name - Tim Brooke-Taylor

Song: I Ain't Got Rhythm (That's Why I've Got the Blues) (Bill Oddie)

Ug's Fashions
 Character name - Greame Garden
 Character name - David Hatch
 Character name - Jo Kendall
 Character name - Bill Oddie
 Character name - Tim Brooke-Taylor

Louis Armstrong
 Character name - Greame Garden
 Character name - David Hatch
 Character name - Jo Kendall
 Character name - Bill Oddie
 Character name - Tim Brooke-Taylor

Artistic Specimens
 Character name - Greame Garden
 Character name - David Hatch
 Character name - Jo Kendall
 Character name - Bill Oddie
 Character name - Tim Brooke-Taylor

Cricket Spectators
 Character name - Greame Garden
 Character name - David Hatch
 Character name - Jo Kendall
 Character name - Bill Oddie
 Character name - Tim Brooke-Taylor

Song: The House of the Rising Sun'' (Graeme Garden, Bill Oddie, and Tim Brooke-Taylor)

Swan Lake Commentary
 Character name - Greame Garden
 Character name - David Hatch
 Character name - Jo Kendall
 Character name - Bill Oddie
 Character name - Tim Brooke-Taylor

V plays

The Vikings

Cast

Structure of the episode

Voyages of Ulysses

Cast

Structure of the episode

W plays

Watergate

Cast

Structure of the episode

William Tell

Cast

Structure of the episode

William the Conqueror

Cast

Structure of the episode

World of Sport

Cast

Structure of the episode

X - Y - Z plays

External links

ISIRTA plays